Masud Sabri, also known as Masʿūd Ṣabrī (1886–1952), was an ethnic Uyghur politician of the Republic of China who served as the Governor of Sinkiang during the Ili Rebellion. He received education at Kulja and Istanbul and was a Pan-Turkist. Chiang Kai-shek appointed him the first non-Han governor of any Chinese province during the twentieth century.

Education

After attending University of Istanbul and learning medicine, Sabri returned to Sinkiang to become a pharmacist.

Career
Governor of Sinkiang Yang Zengxin jailed Masud Sabri for pan turkist activities and then deported him from the province.

Masud supported the First East Turkestan Republic while based at Aqsu with Mahmud Sijan. After it was crushed by the 36th Division (National Revolutionary Army) Masud fled to British India and then to Nanking, where he joined the Kuomintang Republic of China government. The Central Military Academy and Central University accepted some of his relatives as students in Nanking after he joined the Central Executive Committee of the Kuomintang.

In 1942, Masud Sabri was serving on the 36 seated State Council (Chinese National Political Council), the only other Muslim member was the Chinese Muslim General Ma Lin.

Bai Chongxi, the Defence Minister of China and a Muslim, was considered for being appointed Governor of Sinkiang. The position was then given to Masud Sabri, who was pro Kuomintang and anti-Soviet. He replaced Zhang Zhizhong. Ehmetjan Qasim, the Communist Uyghur Ili leader, repeatedly demanded that Masud Sabri be sacked as governor.

Masud Sabri was an opponent of the Soviet sponsored Second East Turkistan Republic in Ili during the Ili Rebellion, opposing all efforts to negotiate with Ehmetjan Qasim along with others like Wang Tseng-shan, a Chinese Muslim, who was the KMT commissioner of Civil Affairs in the Sinkiang Coalition Government from 1946–47, and was associated with the CC Clique. Masud Sabri was also a CC Clique member, as was the Tatar Burhan Shahidi and the KMT-general and Han-Chinese Wu Zhongxin. He led the Sinkiang coalition government from 1948-1949 Masud Sabri formed a group of pan turkists with Muhammad Amin Bughra and Isa Yusuf Alptekin to join the Kuomintang Republic of China coalition government in Sinkiang, opposing the Uyghur Communist Ili regime in the Second East Turkestan Republic.There were 3 Effendis, (Üch Äpändi) (ئۈچ ئەپەندى) Aisa Alptekin, Memtimin Bughra (Muhammad Amin Bughra), and Masud Sabri. The Second East Turkestan Republic attacked them as Kuomintang "puppets". Ehmetjan Qasim's government in Ili attacked Isa Yusuf Alptekin, Muhammad Amin Bughra, and Masud Sabri as supporters of the Kuomintang and puppets of imperialism.

Masud Sabri and fellow Pan-Turkic Jadidist and East Turkestan Independence activist Muhammad Amin Bughra rejected the Soviet imposition of the name "Uyghur people" upon the Turkic people of Sinkiang. They wanted instead the name "Turkic ethnicity" (Tujue zu in Chinese) to be applied to their people. Masud Sabri also viewed the Hui people as Muslim Han Chinese and separate from his own people. The names "Türk" or "Türki" in particular were demanded by Bughra as the real name for his people. He slammed Sheng Shicai for his designation of Turkic Muslims into different ethnicities which could sow disunion among Turkic Muslims.

In 1948 Sabri turned down the proposal of being appointed ambassador to Iran from China.

In January 1949, Burhan Shahidi succeeded Masud Sabri as the chairman of Sinkiang Provincial Government.

The Communist Party placed him under detention and imprisoned him in 1951. He died in 1952, still incarcerated. Alternatively, according to Xinjiang specialist Sean R. Roberts, the CCP had Sabri executed in 1951.

References

External links

The Soviets in Xinjiang (1911-1949) by Mark Dickens

Ili Rebellion
Uyghurs
Chinese Muslims
Chinese Nationalist military figures
Republic of China politicians from Xinjiang
Prisoners who died in Chinese detention
1886 births
1952 deaths
People from Yining County
Darülfünun alumni